Mare Desiderii  (Latin dēsīderiī, the "Sea of Dreams") was an area of the Moon named after Luna 3 returned the first pictures of the far side in 1959. This name is derived from the Russian Море Мечты, Mechta ("Dream") being the original name for the Luna 1 spacecraft. 

It was later determined to be an optical illusion in the low quality image. The International Astronomical Union (IAU) removed the name from the list of lunar nomenclature in 1960. Instead this area includes a smaller mare, Mare Ingenii (Sea of Ingenuity or Cleverness), and other dark craters.

The naming of this and other features by the Soviet Union was considered controversial at the time. The newly named places on Soviet lunar maps were perceived as an extension of Soviet territory. The IAU was then given the responsibility for naming newly discovered features.

References

 

Desiderii